Frankenhalle is a multi-purpose indoor arena located on the site of the Messezentrum Nuremberg in Nuremberg, Germany. The arena opened in 1984 and has a capacity of 5,000 people. It hosts concerts, exhibitions, fairs and other events.

References 

Buildings and structures in Nuremberg
Music venues in Germany
Indoor arenas in Germany